Bryan George Jeffrey Smeets (born 22 November 1992) is a Dutch professional footballer who plays as a midfielder for Challenger Pro League club RWDM.

Club career
He formerly played for MVV Maastricht, De Graafschap and SC Cambuur. He is best known for scoring the equalizer against Ajax in 2016, which dramatically decided the winner of the Eredivisie title to be PSV Eindhoven.

On 1 February 2022, Smeets signed with Lommel in Belgium. 

Only months later, on 18 May 2022, Smeets was announced as the first signing ahead of the 2022–23 season for RWDM. He signed a two-year deal with an option for an additional year.

International career
He was part of the Netherlands squad at the 2009 FIFA U-17 World Cup.

References

External links
 
 Voetbal International profile 
 

1992 births
Footballers from Maastricht
Living people
Dutch footballers
Netherlands youth international footballers
Association football midfielders
MVV Maastricht players
De Graafschap players
SC Cambuur players
TOP Oss players
Sparta Rotterdam players
Lommel S.K. players
RWDM47 players
Eredivisie players
Eerste Divisie players
Challenger Pro League players
Dutch expatriate footballers
Expatriate footballers in Belgium
Dutch expatriate sportspeople in Belgium